Asca is a genus of mites.

Asca or ASCA may also refer to:

Organisations 
 ASCA (news agency), Italy (founded 1969)
 Accumulating savings & credit association, a form of microfinance
 American Swimming Coaches Association (founded 1958)
 Association for Student Conduct Administration, United States (founded 1987)

People 
 Asca (singer) or Asuka Ōkura (born 1996), Japanese musician

Science 
 Advanced Satellite for Cosmology and Astrophysics, launched from Japan in 1993
 ANOVA-simultaneous component analysis, in bioinformatics
 Anti-saccharomyces cerevisiae antibody, in immunology